

Early life and career 

McMeekin grew up in Rochester, New York and studied history at Stanford University (B.A. 1996) and the University of California, Berkeley (M.A. 1998 and PhD 2001) as well as in Paris, Berlin, and Moscow. He also held a Henry Chauncey Jr. '57 Postdoctoral Fellowship at Yale and was a fellow of the Remarque Institute at New York University. McMeekin taught in Turkey as an assistant professor in the Centre for Russian Studies at Bilkent University in Ankara and in the College of Social Sciences and Humanities of Koç University in Istanbul. He is now Francis Flournoy Professor of European History and Culture at Bard College in New York state.

His main research interests include modern German history, Russian history, communism, and the First and Second World Wars. He has authored eight books, along with scholarly articles which have appeared in journals such as Contemporary European History, Common Knowledge, Current History, Historically Speaking, The World Today, and Communisme.

McMeekin's 2011 book The Russian Origins of the First World War was initially praised as a "bold and brilliant revisionist study" for its use of "long-neglected tsarist documents," but also criticized by other historians for its core theses, which advance a view of Russian involvement beyond that of what other  historians have concluded. Because McMeekin was the first historian to publish questionable documents from the Tsarist archives showing Russian support for Armenian groups inside the Ottoman empire during the war, his treatment of the Armenian genocide has also been criticized, with one scholar pointing out that "The mass slaughter of Armenian civilians was in no way justified by the haphazard Russian support for Armenian paramilitary groups in Eastern Anatolia." But as another reviewer noted, "if McMeekin's purpose was merely to exonerate all Ottoman behavior and play down Armenian suffering, he would not have included the observation of a Venezuelan soldier of fortune who saw on a mountainside 'thousands of half-nude and bleeding Armenian corpses, piled in heaps or interlaced in death's final embrace.'"

McMeekin's 2013 book July 1914: Countdown to War has been described, in the New York Review of Books, as "a punchy and riveting narrative" which is "almost impossible to put down." The Guardian called his 2015 study The Ottoman Endgame: War, Revolution, and the Making of the Modern Middle East "a marvelous exposition of the Historian's art."

His 2021 book, Stalin’s War, received positive review in the US from the National Review ("brilliantly inquisitive book") and in the UK from The Times ("a terrific read"), The Guardian ("an impressive study"), and The Financial Times ("an accomplished, fearless and enthusiastic “Myth-buster” "). It also received positive reviews from historians Simon Sebag Montefiore, Geoffrey Wawro, and Antony Beevor who called it "…both original and refreshing, written as it is with a wonderful clarity.". The book got mixed reviews from Lawrence Freedman in Foreign Affairs: "McMeekin’s research is prodigious, and his writing is vigorous, but in the end, he pushes his argument past the breaking point" and Nina L. Khrushcheva in Project Syndicate: "Weighing in at some 800 pages, Stalin’s War compiles an impressive amount of historical information. But, given McMeekin’s procrustean framework, it comes across as cluelessly arrogant.". Historian Mark Edele said that the book contains misquotes of Stalin's speeches, and included sources refuted decades beforehand, or else long ago shown to be fraudulent. Edele concluded "A gifted writer and a talented polemicist, he has lowered the historian’s craft to the level of propaganda. The result is a lamentable step back in our understanding of Stalin and his second world war." Historian Geoffrey Roberts called it a "Disorted history of a complex second World War" but also says "To his credit, McMeekin  doesn’t excuse Hitler’s attack on the Soviet Union as a preventative war or claim that Stalin was preparing to attack Germany."

Prizes 
 2010: Barbara Jelavich Book Prize for The Berlin-Baghdad Express
 2011: Norman B. Tomlinson Jr. Book Prize for The Russian Origins of the First World War
 2015: Arthur Goodzeit Book Award for The Ottoman Endgame
 2016: Historian's Prize of the Erich-und-Erna-Kronauer-Stiftung

Selected works

References

External links
 Sean McMeekin on C-SPAN.
 insidestory.org.au

1974 births
Living people
21st-century American historians
21st-century American male writers
Historians from Idaho
Stanford University alumni
University of California, Berkeley alumni
Bard College faculty
American male non-fiction writers